The 2009–10 Denver Nuggets season was the 43rd season of the franchise, its 34th in the National Basketball Association (NBA). After their trip the Conference Finals last season, the Nuggets started the season 35-18 before the All-Star break. Coach George Karl and Carmelo Anthony were the only Nuggets to represent the Western Conference in the 2010 NBA All-Star Game. However, not long after the break, dark clouds gathered around the team as coach Karl was diagnosed with neck and throat cancer. Adrian Dantley took over and the team struggled in the second half of the season, finishing with a 53-29 record and earned the number 4 seed in the West. Denver's season ended in the first round with a defeat to the Utah Jazz in six games. The Nuggets had the third best team offensive rating in the NBA.

Key dates 
 June 25 – The 2009 NBA draft took place in New York City.
 July 8 – The free agency period started.

Free Agency 
On July 8, the Nuggets re-signed fan favorite Chris "Birdman" Andersen to a 5-year, $21.17 million contract, worth up to $26 million with incentives. However, on July 13, the Nuggets lost starting shooting guard Dahntay Jones, who signed a 4-year, $10.6 million contract with the Indiana Pacers. The Nuggets also lost reserve forward Linas Kleiza to Greek team Olympiacos Piraeus on August 10, when he signed a 2-year, $12.2 million contract. On August 16, backup point guard Anthony Carter was re-signed to a 1-year minimum-salary contract worth $1,306,455. On August 27, the team re-signed reserve center Johan Petro to a 1-year minimum-salary contract worth $884,881. On September 25, the Nuggets signed forward Joey Graham to a 1-year, non-guaranteed, minimum salary contract worth $884,881. On September 28, reserve point guard Jason Hart signed a 1-year non-guaranteed minimum-salary contract with the Minnesota Timberwolves. On September 26, the team also signed forward Keith Brumbaugh, point guard Dontaye Draper, and center Kurt Looby to non-guaranteed contracts for training camp. Brumbaugh was waived on October 10. Draper and Looby were waived on October 21.

Trades 
The Nuggets made two draft-day trades as well as several others later in the offseason. On draft day, the Nuggets acquired the draft rights to point guard Ty Lawson, the 18th overall pick, from Minnesota in exchange for Charlotte's 2010 1st round pick, which they had previously acquired. The Nuggets also traded the draft rights to point guard Sergio Llull, a second round pick (34th overall), to the Houston Rockets in exchange for $2.25 million cash. On July 13, the Nuggets acquired shooting guard Arron Afflalo, forward Walter Sharpe, and $350,000 cash from the Detroit Pistons in exchange for a 2011 2nd round pick. The pick will be the lower of the Nuggets' and Blazers' selections, which the Nuggets previously acquired. On July 31, the Nuggets acquired power forward Malik Allen from the Milwaukee Bucks in exchange for swingman Sonny Weems, Sharpe, and cash considerations. On August 10, the Nuggets traded F/C Steven Hunter, their 2010 1st round pick, and $3 million cash to the Memphis Grizzlies for a 2014 conditional 2nd round pick. On September 22, the Nuggets acquired swingman James White from Houston in exchange for the draft rights to forward Axel Hervelle, a 2005 2nd round pick (52nd overall). White was waived on October 21.

Draft 

* Acquired from Minnesota.
x Traded to Houston.

Roster

Pre-season

Regular season

Standings

Record vs. opponents

Game log 

|- bgcolor="#bbffbb"
| 1
| October 28
| Jazz
| 
| Carmelo Anthony (30)
| Kenyon Martin (11)
| Ty Lawson (6)
| Pepsi Center19,155
| 1-0
|- bgcolor="#bbffbb"
| 2
| October 29
| @ Trail Blazers
| 
| Carmelo Anthony (41)
| Nenê (11)
| Chauncey Billups (6)
| Rose Garden Arena20,218
| 2-0
|-

|- bgcolor="#bbffbb"
| 3
| November 1
| Grizzlies
| 
| Carmelo Anthony (42)
| Nenê (9)
| Chauncey Billups (12)
| Pepsi Center15,823
| 3-0
|- bgcolor="#bbffbb"
| 4
| November 3
| @ Pacers
| 
| Carmelo Anthony (25)
| Nenê (13)
| Anthony Carter (5)
| Conseco Fieldhouse10,627
| 4-0
|- bgcolor="#bbffbb"
| 5
| November 4
| @ Nets
| 
| Ty Lawson (23)
| Kenyon Martin (10)
| Chauncey Billups (5)
| Izod Center15,319
| 5-0
|- bgcolor="#ffcccc"
| 6
| November 6
| @ Heat
| 
| Carmelo Anthony (30)
| Carmelo Anthony, Nenê (8)
| Chauncey Billups, Carmelo Anthony, Ty Lawson, Arron Afflalo (2)
| AmericanAirlines Arena19,600
| 5-1
|- bgcolor="#ffcccc"
| 7
| November 7
| @ Hawks
| 
| Carmelo Anthony (30)
| Chris Andersen (11)
| Chauncey Billups (7)
| Philips Arena17,801
| 5-2
|- bgcolor="#bbffbb"
| 8
| November 10
| @ Bulls
| 
| Carmelo Anthony (20)
| Nenê (12)
| Chauncey Billups (6)
| United Center21,409
| 6-2
|- bgcolor="#ffcccc"
| 9
| November 11
| @ Bucks
| 
| Carmelo Anthony (32)
| Carmelo Anthony (10)
| Chauncey Billups, Ty Lawson (5)
| Bradley Center12,987
| 6-3
|- bgcolor="#bbffbb"
| 10
| November 13
| Lakers
| 
| Carmelo Anthony (25)
| Chris Andersen (11)
| Chauncey Billups (8)
| Pepsi Center19,141
| 7-3
|- bgcolor="#bbffbb"
| 11
| November 17
| Raptors
| 
| Carmelo Anthony (32)
| Nenê (10)
| Chauncey Billups (10)
| Pepsi Center16,446
| 8-3
|- bgcolor="#ffcccc"
| 12
| November 20
| @ Clippers
| 
| Carmelo Anthony (37)
| Nenê (12)
| Chauncey Billups (7)
| Staples Center18,155
| 8-4
|- bgcolor="#bbffbb"
| 13
| November 21
| Bulls
| 
| Carmelo Anthony (30)
| Carmelo Anthony, Kenyon Martin (11)
| Carmelo Anthony (7)
| Pepsi Center19,359
| 9-4
|- bgcolor="#bbffbb"
| 14
| November 24
| Nets
| 
| Carmelo Anthony (27)
| Nenê (9)
| Chauncey Billups (7)
| Pepsi Center16,307
| 10-4
|- bgcolor="#bbffbb"
| 15
| November 25
| @ Timberwolves
| 
| Carmelo Anthony (22)
| Nenê (8)
| Nenê, Ty Lawson (6)
| Target Center13,101
| 11-4
|- bgcolor="#bbffbb"
| 16
| November 27
| Knicks
| 
| Carmelo Anthony (50)
| Nenê, Kenyon Martin (11)
| Chauncey Billups (8)
| Pepsi Center19,155
| 12-4
|- bgcolor="#ffcccc"
| 17
| November 29
| Timberwolves
| 
| Carmelo Anthony (32)
| Kenyon Martin (14)
| Nenê (5)
| Pepsi Center15,147
| 12-5
|-

|- bgcolor="#bbffbb"
| 18
| December 1
| Warriors
| 
| Carmelo Anthony (25)
| Nenê (12)
| Chauncey Billups (8)
| Pepsi Center14,570
| 13-5
|- bgcolor="#bbffbb"
| 19
| December 3
| Heat
| 
| Carmelo Anthony (22)
| Chris Andersen (10)
| Chauncey Billups (7)
| Pepsi Center14,998
| 14-5
|- bgcolor="#bbffbb"
| 20
| December 5
| @ Spurs
| 
| Carmelo Anthony (34)
| Kenyon Martin (13)
| Chauncey Billups (5)
| AT&T Center17,592
| 15-5
|- bgcolor="#bbffbb"
| 21
| December 7
| @ 76ers
| 
| Chauncey Billups (31)
| Chauncey Billups (8)
| Chauncey Billups (8)
| Wachovia Center20,664
| 16-5
|- bgcolor="#ffcccc"
| 22
| December 8
| @ Bobcats
| 
| Carmelo Anthony (34)
| Nenê (10)
| J.R. Smith (4)
| Time Warner Cable Arena14,127
| 16-6
|- bgcolor="#ffcccc"
| 23
| December 10
| @ Pistons
| 
| Carmelo Anthony (40)
| Nenê (11)
| Ty Lawson (4)
| The Palace of Auburn Hills17,176
| 16-7
|- bgcolor="#bbffbb"
| 24
| December 12
| Suns
| 
| Carmelo Anthony (32)
| Chris Andersen (10)
| Chauncey Billups (8)
| Pepsi Center19,155
| 17-7
|- bgcolor="#bbffbb"
| 25
| December 14
| Thunder
| 
| Carmelo Anthony (31)
| Chris Andersen, Kenyon Martin (11)
| Chauncey Billups (7)
| Pepsi Center16,022
| 18-7
|- bgcolor="#bbffbb"
| 26
| December 16
| Rockets
| 
| Carmelo Anthony (38)
| Chris Andersen (11)
| Ty Lawson (6)
| Pepsi Center15,753
| 19-7
|- bgcolor="#ffcccc"
| 27
| December 18
| @ Hornets
| 
| J.R. Smith (25)
| Kenyon Martin (13)
| Anthony Carter (5)
| New Orleans Arena14,453
| 19-8
|- bgcolor="#ffcccc"
| 28
| December 20
| @ Grizzlies
| 
| Carmelo Anthony (41)
| Chris Andersen (14)
| Anthony Carter (7)
| FedExForum13,385
| 19-9
|- bgcolor="#bbffbb"
| 29
| December 23
| Hawks
| 
| J.R. Smith (41)
| Kenyon Martin, Nenê (8)
| Carmelo Anthony, Anthony Carter (7)
| Pepsi Center19,155
| 20-9
|- bgcolor="#ffcccc"
| 30
| December 25
| @ Trail Blazers
| 
| Carmelo Anthony (32)
| Kenyon Martin (14)
| Chauncey Billups (5)
| Rose Garden Arena20,664
| 20-10
|- bgcolor="#ffcccc"
| 31
| December 27
| Mavericks
| 
| Kenyon Martin (18)
| Carmelo Anthony (12)
| Arron Afflalo, Carmelo Anthony, Ty Lawson, J.R. Smith (4)
| Pepsi Center19,756
| 20-11
|- bgcolor="#ffcccc"
| 32
| December 28
| @ Kings
| 
| Carmelo Anthony (34)
| Kenyon Martin (12)
| Ty Lawson (6)
| ARCO Arena14,548
| 20-12
|-

|- bgcolor="#bbffbb"
| 33
| January 2
| @ Jazz
| 
| Ty Lawson (23)
| Kenyon Martin (12)
| Ty Lawson (9)
| EnergySolutions Arena19,911
| 21-12
|- bgcolor="#ffcccc"
| 34
| January 3
| 76ers
| 
| Nenê (24)
| Nenê (15)
| Ty Lawson (9)
| Pepsi Center19,155
| 21-13
|- bgcolor="#bbffbb"
| 35
| January 5
| Warriors
| 
| Kenyon Martin (27)
| Kenyon Martin (13)
| Ty Lawson (8)
| Pepsi Center15,129
| 22-13
|- bgcolor="#bbffbb"
| 36
| January 8
| Cavaliers
| 
| Chauncey Billups (23)
| Kenyon Martin (12)
| Chauncey Billups (5)
| Pepsi Center19,996
| 23-13
|- bgcolor="#ffcccc"
| 37
| January 9
| @ Kings
| 
| Chauncey Billups (27)
| Kenyon Martin (10)
| Kenyon Martin (5)
| ARCO Arena14,411
| 23-14
|- bgcolor="#bbffbb"
| 38
| January 11
| Timberwolves
| 
| Carmelo Anthony (24)
| Kenyon Martin (15)
| Chauncey Billups (10)
| Pepsi Center14,669
| 24-14
|- bgcolor="#bbffbb"
| 39
| January 13
| Magic
| 
| Carmelo Anthony (27)
| Kenyon Martin (10)
| Anthony Carter (6)
| Pepsi Center18,475
| 25-14
|- bgcolor="#bbffbb"
| 40
| January 17
| Jazz
| 
| Carmelo Anthony (37)
| Kenyon Martin (9)
| J.R. Smith (5)
| Pepsi Center19,519
| 26-14
|- bgcolor="#bbffbb"
| 41
| January 20
| @ Warriors
| OT
| Chauncey Billups (37)
| Kenyon Martin (14)
| Chauncey Billups (8)
| Oracle Arena17,223
| 27-14
|- bgcolor="#bbffbb"
| 42
| January 21
| Clippers
| 
| Carmelo Anthony (28)
| Kenyon Martin (14)
| Chauncey Billups (6)
| Pepsi Center15,343
| 28-14
|- bgcolor="#bbffbb"
| 43
| January 23
| Hornets
| 
| Carmelo Anthony (30)
| Kenyon Martin (14)
| Chauncey Billups (9)
| Pepsi Center19,807
| 29-14
|- bgcolor="#bbffbb"
| 44
| January 25
| Bobcats
| 
| Chauncey Billups (27)
| Chauncey Billups, J.R. Smith (6)
| Chauncey Billups (11)
| Pepsi Center16,909
| 30-14
|- bgcolor="#bbffbb"
| 45
| January 27
| @ Rockets
| 
| J.R. Smith (22)
| Kenyon Martin (15)
| Chauncey Billups (4)
| Toyota Center16,357
| 31-14
|- bgcolor="#ffcccc"
| 46
| January 29
| @ Thunder
| 
| J.R. Smith (19)
| Kenyon Martin (9)
| Chauncey Billups (7)
| Ford Center18,203
| 31-15
|- bgcolor="#bbffbb"
| 47
| January 31
| @ Spurs
| 
| Chauncey Billups (25)
| Kenyon Martin (11)
| Chauncey Billups (11)
| AT&T Center17,607
| 32-15
|-

|- bgcolor="#bbffbb"
| 48
| February 1
| Kings
| 
| Kenyon Martin (24)
| Kenyon Martin (12)
| Chauncey Billups (9)
| Pepsi Center15,544
| 33-15
|- bgcolor="#ffcccc"
| 49
| February 3
| Suns
| 
| Nenê, J.R. Smith (15)
| Kenyon Martin (10)
| J.R. Smith (5)
| Pepsi Center19,155
| 33-16
|- bgcolor="#bbffbb"
| 50
| February 5
| @ Lakers
| 
| Chauncey Billups (39)
| Chris Andersen (15)
| Chauncey Billups (8)
| Staples Center18,997
| 34-16
|- bgcolor="#ffcccc"
| 51
| February 6
| @ Jazz
| 
| Ty Lawson (25)
| Kenyon Martin (13)
| Ty Lawson (4)
| EnergySolutions Arena19,911
| 34-17
|- bgcolor="#bbffbb"
| 52
| February 9
| Mavericks
| 
| Nenê (21)
| Chris Andersen (10)
| Ty Lawson (7)
| Pepsi Center17,485
| 35-17
|- bgcolor="#ffcccc"
| 53
| February 11
| Spurs
| 
| Nenê (20)
| Nenê (9)
| Chauncey Billups (7)
| Pepsi Center18,611
| 35-18
|- bgcolor="#bbffbb"
| 54
| February 18
| @ Cavaliers
| 
| Carmelo Anthony (40)
| Kenyon Martin (17)
| Chauncey Billups (8)
| Quicken Loans Arena20,562
| 36-18
|- bgcolor="#ffcccc"
| 55
| February 19
| @ Wizards
| 
| Chauncey Billups (28)
| Kenyon Martin, Nenê (9)
| Ty Lawson (3)
| Verizon Center17,212
| 36-19
|- bgcolor="#bbffbb"
| 56
| February 21
| Celtics
| 
| Chauncey Billups (26)
| Kenyon Martin, Nenê (10)
| Carmelo Anthony (8)
| Pepsi Center19,818
| 37-19
|- bgcolor="#bbffbb"
| 57
| February 25
| @ Warriors
| 
| Chauncey Billups (37)
| Chris Andersen (11)
| Chauncey Billups (9)
| Oracle Arena18,555
| 38-19
|- bgcolor="#bbffbb"
| 58
| February 26
| Pistons
| 
| Chauncey Billups (25)
| Joey Graham (7)
| Ty Lawson, Nenê, J.R. Smith (4)
| Pepsi Center19,845
| 39-19
|- bgcolor="#ffcccc"
| 59
| February 28
| @ Lakers
| 
| Carmelo Anthony (21)
| Nenê (11)
| Chauncey Billups (4)
| Staples Center18,997
| 39-20
|-

|- bgcolor="#ffcccc"
| 60
| March 1
| @ Suns
| 
| Chauncey Billups (21)
| Kenyon Martin (10)
| Carmelo Anthony, Chauncey Billups (4)
| US Airways Center18,159
| 39-21
|- bgcolor="#bbffbb"
| 61
| March 3
| Thunder
| 
| Carmelo Anthony (30)
| Kenyon Martin (13)
| Anthony Carter (12)
| Pepsi Center18,822
| 40-21
|- bgcolor="#bbffbb"
| 62
| March 5
| Pacers
| 
| Carmelo Anthony (34)
| Chris Andersen (10)
| J.R. Smith (8)
| Pepsi Center19,155
| 41-21
|- bgcolor="#bbffbb"
| 63
| March 7
| Trail Blazers
| 
| Carmelo Anthony (30)
| Johan Petro (10)
| J.R. Smith (7)
| Pepsi Center17,266
| 42-21
|- bgcolor="#bbffbb"
| 64
| March 10
| @ Timberwolves
| 
| Chauncey Billups (25)
| Chris Andersen (10)
| Anthony Carter (8)
| Target Center14,256
| 43-21
|- bgcolor="#bbffbb"
| 65
| March 12
| @ Hornets
| 
| Carmelo Anthony (32)
| Carmelo Anthony, Nenê (12)
| Chauncey Billups (7)
| New Orleans Arena17,220
| 44-21
|- bgcolor="#bbffbb"
| 66
| March 13
| @ Grizzlies
| 
| J.R. Smith (30)
| Carmelo Anthony, Arron Afflalo (6)
| Anthony Carter (7)
| FedExForum17,023
| 45-21
|- bgcolor="#ffcccc"
| 67
| March 15
| @ Rockets
| 
| Carmelo Anthony (45)
| Carmelo Anthony, Nenê, Johan Petro (10)
| Nenê (5)
| Toyota Center16,369
| 45-22
|- bgcolor="#bbffbb"
| 68
| March 16
| Wizards
| 
| Carmelo Anthony (29)
| Carmelo Anthony (12)
| Anthony Carter, Nenê (4)
| Pepsi Center17,447
| 46-22
|- bgcolor="#bbffbb"
| 69
| March 18
| Hornets
| 
| Carmelo Anthony (26)
| Carmelo Anthony (18)
| Chauncey Billups (8)
| Pepsi Center19,155
| 47-22
|- bgcolor="#ffcccc"
| 70
| March 20
| Bucks
| 
| Carmelo Anthony, Chauncey Billups (29)
| Chris Andersen (12)
| Anthony Carter (4)
| Pepsi Center19,390
| 47-23
|- bgcolor="#ffcccc"
| 71
| March 23
| @ Knicks
| 
| Carmelo Anthony (36)
| Chris Andersen, Joey Graham, Nenê (7)
| Chauncey Billups (6)
| Madison Square Garden19,763
| 47-24
|- bgcolor="#ffcccc"
| 72
| March 24
| @ Celtics
| 
| Carmelo Anthony (32)
| Chris Andersen, Chauncey Billups (7)
| Chauncey Billups (6)
| TD Banknorth Garden18,624
| 47-25
|- bgcolor="#bbffbb"
| 73
| March 26
| @ Raptors
| 
| Carmelo Anthony (25)
| Nenê (9)
| Nenê (6)
| Air Canada Centre19,800
| 48-25
|- bgcolor="#ffcccc"
| 74
| March 28
| @ Magic
| 
| Carmelo Anthony (26)
| Carmelo Anthony, Arron Afflalo (8)
| Chauncey Billups (5)
| Amway Arena17,461
| 48-26
|- bgcolor="#ffcccc"
| 75
| March 29
| @ Mavericks
| 
| J.R. Smith (27)
| Carmelo Anthony (9)
| Chauncey Billups (6)
| American Airlines Center20,085
| 48-27
|-

|- bgcolor="#bbffbb"
| 76
| April 1
| Trail Blazers
| 
| Carmelo Anthony (25)
| Chris Andersen (6)
| Chauncey Billups (6)
| Pepsi Center19,155
| 49-27
|- bgcolor="#bbffbb"
| 77
| April 3
| Clippers
| 
| Carmelo Anthony (24)
| Arron Afflalo (9)
| Chauncey Billups (6)
| Pepsi Center19,155
| 50-27
|- bgcolor="#bbffbb"
| 78
| April 7
| @ Thunder
| 
| Chauncey Billups (29)
| Nenê (13)
| Chauncey Billups (4)
| Ford Center18,332
| 51-27
|- bgcolor="#bbffbb"
| 79
| April 8
| Lakers
| 
| Carmelo Anthony (31)
| Chris Andersen, Nenê, Johan Petro (7)
| Chauncey Billups (6)
| Pepsi Center20,044
| 52-27
|- bgcolor="#ffcccc"
| 80
| April 10
| Spurs
| 
| Chauncey Billups (27)
| Kenyon Martin (10)
| Chauncey Billups, Ty Lawson, J.R. Smith (3)
| Pepsi Center19,155
| 52-28
|- bgcolor="#bbffbb"
| 81
| April 12
| Grizzlies
| 
| J.R. Smith (26)
| Arron Afflalo (13)
| Chauncey Billups (7)
| Pepsi Center19,155
| 53-28
|- bgcolor="#ffcccc"
| 82
| April 13
| @ Suns
| 
| Carmelo Anthony (29)
| Carmelo Anthony (6)
| Ty Lawson (5)
| US Airways Center18,422
| 53-29
|-

Playoffs

Game log 

|- bgcolor="bbffbb"
| 1
| April 17
| Utah
| 
| Carmelo Anthony (42)
| Kenyon Martin (12)
| Chauncey Billups (8)
| Pepsi Center19,155
| 1–0
|- bgcolor="#ffcccc"
| 2
| April 19
| Utah
| 
| Carmelo Anthony (32)
| Carmelo Anthony, Nenê, J.R. Smith (6)
| Chauncey Billups (11)
| Pepsi Center19,155
| 1–1
|- bgcolor="#ffcccc"
| 3
| April 23
| @ Utah
| 
| Carmelo Anthony, Chauncey Billups (25)
| Kenyon Martin (13)
| Chauncey Billups, Anthony Carter (3)
| EnergySolutions Arena19,911
| 1–2
|- bgcolor="#ffcccc"
| 4
| April 25
| @ Utah
| 
| Carmelo Anthony (39)
| Carmelo Anthony, Nenê (11)
| Chauncey Billups (4)
| EnergySolutions Arena19,911
| 1–3
|- bgcolor="bbffbb"
| 5
| April 28
| Utah
| 
| Carmelo Anthony (26)
| Carmelo Anthony (11)
| Chauncey Billups, Nenê (4)
| Pepsi Center19,155
| 2–3
|- bgcolor="#ffcccc"
| 6
| April 30
| @ Utah
| 
| Chauncey Billups (30)
| Carmelo Anthony (12)
| Chauncey Billups (8)
| EnergySolutions Arena19,911
| 2–4

Player statistics

Regular season

Playoffs

Awards, records and milestones

Awards

Week/Month 
 Carmelo Anthony was named Western Conference Player of the Week for games played from Tuesday, Oct. 27 through Sunday, Nov. 1.
 Carmelo Anthony was named Western Conference Player of the Month for games played during the month of November.
 Carmelo Anthony was named Western Conference Player of the Week for games played from Monday, Jan. 11 through Sunday, Jan. 17.
 Chauncey Billups was named Western Conference Player of the Week for games played from Monday, Jan. 18 through Sunday, Jan. 24.

All-Star 

 Carmelo Anthony was voted as an NBA Western Conference All-Star starter.
 Chauncey Billups was named to the NBA Western Conference All-Star team as a replacement for Chris Paul. Billups finished in 3rd place in the 3-point contest.

Season 
 Carmelo Anthony was named to the All-NBA Second Team.

Records

Milestones

Injuries and surgeries

Transactions

References

External links 
 2009–10 Denver Nuggets season at ESPN
 2009–10 Denver Nuggets season at Basketball Reference

Denver Nuggets seasons
Denver
Denver Nuggets
Denver Nuggets